Otto Vergaerde (born 15 July 1994) is a Belgian cyclist, who currently rides for UCI WorldTeam .

Major results

Track
2011
 3rd Madison, UEC European Junior Championships (with Jonas Rickaert)
2012
 2nd Madison, UCI Juniors World Championships (with Jonas Rickaert)
2014
 UEC European Championships
1st  Scratch
2nd Madison (with Kenny De Ketele)
 2nd Madison, UEC European Under-23 Championships (with Jasper De Buyst)
2015
 3rd Madison, UCI World Championships (with Jasper De Buyst)

Road
2013
 1st Mémorial Pierre Harinck
 1st Mémorial Anita Lambert
2019
 6th Grote Prijs Stad Zottegem
 9th Memorial Rik Van Steenbergen
 10th Elfstedenronde
2020 
 10th Overall Czech Cycling Tour

Grand Tour general classification results timeline

References

External links

1994 births
Living people
Belgian male cyclists
Sportspeople from Ghent
Cyclists from East Flanders